Free TV (stylized as free) is a 24-hour pan-Arab musical television channel owned by Nasr Mahrous and headquartered in Cairo, Egypt. Its main target demographic is teenagers, high school and college students and young adults. It has special partnerships with FreeMusic, Vevo, Republic Records, Warner Music Group, Universal Music Group and Sony Music.

According to the channel's owner, it was planned that Free TV would be launched in the summer of 2014, however, it was introduced to the world in 2015, via Nilesat. Nasr Mahrous said also that the name of the channel was chosen in order to be similar with "FreeMusic", the name of the record label he owns.

Its main objective is to combine different cultures through the language of entertainment, and to be a showcase of modern and classic Arab and international music blended together. and many other independent labels, in addition to international majors labels such as  Sony, Universal and Warner Music Group.

Free TV is rated on the top of the musical television channels in North Africa and the Middle East, for providing an exclusive, outstanding and quality content of clips and programs, and creating awareness about new talents, songs and albums from all over the Arab world.

Programming 
Free TV airs mainly western music videos of artists signed to Vevo, Republic Records, Warner Music Group, Universal Music Group and Sony Music, as well as many Arab music clips produced by FreeMusic record label, that is also owned by Nasr Mahrous.
 Big Apple Music Awards
 Brit Awards 2017
 Brit Awards
 BRIT Awards
 The Brit Awards
 The BRIT Awards
 Easter Hour
 Free Mashup
 Mashup
 Love Songs
 Latin Hour
 The Mix
 Special Hour
 The Mix Special Hour
 One Direction: This Is Us
 American Music Awards of 2018
 2016 Billboard Music Awards
 American Music Awards
 Billboard Music Awards
 The Nominees
 The Boys
 The Girls
Artist x Artist x Artist:
 Miley Cyrus X Selena Gomez X Demi Lovato
 Drake X Nicki Minaj X Post Malone
 Maroon 5 X One Direction X Ed Sheeran
 J Balvin X Jason Derulo X Bruno Mars
 The Weeknd X Rihanna X Ariana Grande
 Justin Bieber X Shawn Mendes X Charlie Puth
 Taylor Swift x Katy Perry x Adele
 Harry Styles X Shawn Mendes
 Justin Bieber: Greatest Hits
 Dance Hits 
 Worldwide Hits
 Harry Styles
 Justin Bieber
 Girls vs. Boys
 Global Superstars
 Artist: Greatest Hits
 Adele
 Ariana Grande
 Billie Eilish
 Beyonce
 Bruno Mars
 BTS
 Calvin Harris
 Cardi B
 Demi Lovato
 Dua Lipa
 Drake
 Ed Sheeran
 Halsey
 Jonas Brothers
 Justin Bieber
 Kendrick Lamar
 Lady Gaga
 Miley Cyrus
 Nicki Minaj
 One Direction
 Post Malone
 P!nk
 Rihanna
 Sam Smith
 Selena Gomez
 Shawn Mendes
 Taylor Swift
 The Weeknd
Artist vs. Artist
 SZA X Doja Cat
 Harry Styles vs. Zayn
 Coldplay vs. The 1975
 Lil Nas X vs. Kehlani 
Artist vs Artist vs Artist
 Bruno Mars Vs Charlie Puth Vs Shawn Mendes
 The Weeknd Vs BTS Vs J Balvin
 Olivia Rodrigo Vs Dua Lipa Vs Billie Eilish
 Drake Vs Doja Cat Vs Lil Nas X
 Ed Sheeran Vs Taylor Swift Vs Adele
 Imagine Dragons Vs The 1975 Vs Coldplay
 David Guetta X Calvin Harris X Tiesto
 Justin Bieber X Post Malone X Ariana Grande
 Avicii Vs Calvin Vs Guetta
 Adele vs. Sam Smith vs. Ed Sheeran
 Dua Lipa vs. Zara Larrson vs. Mabel
 Martin Garrix VS Tiesto VS Zedd
Hottest
 Superstars!
 The Weeknd Vs Doja Cat Vs Ariana Grande
 Dua Lipa Vs Justin Bieber Vs Camila Cabello
 Worldwide Super Hits
 Drake Vs Post Malone
 Tiësto Vs David Guetta Vs Calvin Harris
 The Collabs!
 Adele Vs Ed Sheeran Vs Lady Gaga
 Imagine Dragons Vs Coldplay
 Ladies Vs Gentlemen!
 Harry Styles Vs Taylor Swift
 BTS Vs Olivia Rodrigo Vs Lil Nas X
Girls
Boys

See also 
 MTV Middle East
 Rotana Mousica

References

External links

 
 
 

Television channels and stations established in 2015
2015 establishments in Egypt
Television stations in Egypt
Arabic-language television stations
English-language television stations
Arab mass media
Music television channels
Music organisations based in Egypt